Eupterote chinensis is a moth in the family Eupterotidae. It was described by John Henry Leech in 1898. It is found in Myanmar, Laos and Thailand.

References

Moths described in 1898
Eupterotinae